The Church of Saint Matthew in Tovarnik is a Roman Catholic church in eastern Croatia. The parish priest Ivan Burik was the only Roman Catholic priest who was killed during the Croatian War of Independence. In the first half 2008 the Government of the Republic of Croatia provided 150,000 Croatian Kuna for completion of the reconstruction of the church. The tower of the Church of Saint Matthew is 40 meters high.

See also
Ilača apparitions
Church of St. George, Tovarnik

Further reading
 Đukez, Tomislav (ed.). Devičić, Antun. (n.d.) Župa Tovarnik. Udruga dr. Ante Starčević & Ured za međunarodnu suradnju TINTL. Tovarnik.

References

Roman Catholic churches in Vukovar-Syrmia County